Nukha Three Saints Church, Nukha Holy Church or Round Temple is former Russian Orthodox church building located in Shaki, Azerbaijan near Khan's Palace, named after Cappadocian Fathers.

History 

Exact foundation history is ambiguous. This situation led some researchers to identify the building as a Caucasian Albanian church, a former mosque and chapel for Imperial Russian garnison. Church's presence was not mentioned prior 1853, when certain priest Yevstafiy was appointed to serve in church. Another priest Gavriil Pechenskiy served in Nukha c. 1894–1896. A Georgian priest, David Utiyev, whose mission was to proselytize local Muslim Ingiloy population of Tasmalı in 1875 was also based in Three Saints Church. His grave is inside the yard of church.

Former mosque claim 
Claim of church being converted from a mosque was mentioned by the Russian traveller Joseph Segal in 1902 and Azerbaijani writer Rashid beg Afandizadeh in 1925. However, according to a report by a Russian officer stationed in the city, it was the khan's home-mosque converted to chapel.

Graveyard 
Church graveyard houses at least three tombstones belonging to Imperial Russian officers and David Utiyev, a Georgian priest.

Current use 
Nowadays it is functioning as local Museum of Folk and Applied Arts. It is listed as country-level important monument in Ministry of Culture database.

Gallery

References

External links 
 

Eastern Orthodox churches in Azerbaijan
19th-century Eastern Orthodox church buildings
Shaki, Azerbaijan